The Enterprise is a Zilog Z80-based home computer announced in 1983, but through a series of delays, not commercially available until 1985. The specification as released was powerful and one of the higher end in its class (though not by the margin envisaged in 1983). This was due to the use of ASICs for graphics and sound which took workload away from the CPU, an extensive implementation of ANSI BASIC and a bank switching system to allow for larger amounts of RAM than the Z80 natively supported. It also featured a distinctive and colourful case design, and promise of multiple expansion options. Ultimately it was not commercially successful, after multiple renames, delays and a changing market place. Its manufacturer calling in the receivers in 1986 with significant debt. It was developed by British company Intelligent Software and marketed by Enterprise Computers. Its two variants are the Enterprise 64, with 64 kilobytes of Random Access Memory (RAM), and the Enterprise 128, with 128 KB of RAM.

Hardware

CPU, memory and ASIC chips 

The Enterprise has a 4 megahertz (MHz) Z80 Central processing unit (CPU), 64 KB (65,536 bytes) or 128 KB of RAM, and 32 KB (32,768 bytes) of internal read-only memory (ROM) that contains the EXOS operating system and a screen editor / word processor. The BASIC programming language was supplied on a 16 KB ROM module.

Two application-specific integrated circuit (ASIC) chips take some of the workload off of the central processor. They are named "Nick" and "Dave" after their designers, Nick Toop, who had previously worked on the Acorn Atom, and Dave Woodfield. "Nick" manages graphics, while "Dave" handles sound and memory paging (bank switching).

A bank switching scheme allows the memory to be expanded to a maximum of 4 megabytes (4,194,304 bytes). The highest 2 address lines from the Z80 are used to select one of the four 8-bit Page Registers in the Dave chip. The output from the selected register is used as the highest 8 bits of the 22-bit address bus, while the lowest 14 bits come directly from the Z80 address bus. Effectively, the 64 KB address space of the Z80 processor is divided into four 16k sections. Any 16k page from the 4 MB address space can be mapped to any of these sections. The lowest two pages (pages 0 and 1) of the 4 MB address space contain system ROM. The next four pages (2 to 5) are reserved for a ROM cartridge (max 64 KB). The top four pages (pages 252 to 255, totaling 64 KB) are used as video RAM, but can be used for storage of program code and data as well. On the 128k model, the additional 64 KB of ram is mapped on pages 248 to 251. The remaining memory space can be used by external devices and memory modules connected to the expansion bus.

Keyboard and case 

The case is unusual in that it contains both a full-sized keyboard with programmable function keys, and a joystick. Its distinctive shape was due to the designers' desire to break away from customary designs. The low-profile keyboard is constructed with mechanical keycaps on top of a rubber membrane and has a standard layout, but the feel of the keys was disliked by many, or even most people, because the keys weren't "full travel", but had a squishy feel, similar to a Sinclair QL or Spectrum+. The joystick replaces the normal cursor keys, and allows the cursor to be moved diagonally.

Royal College of Art graduates Geoff Hollington and Nick Oakley were responsible for the design, having tendered for this particular contract, and had only seven days to produce the visual design concept. Tooling for production of the casing was also demanded in a rapid timeframe and took five months. Originally, a combination of greys was envisaged for the casing elements, but seeking to avoid the look of office equipment and to appeal to "the lower end of the market", the eventual dark grey case with red, green and blue keys was chosen.

Graphics 

Enterprise has four hardware graphics modes: 40-column text modes, Lo-Res and Hi-Res bit mapped graphics, and attribute graphics. The OS offers 80-column text via high-resolution graphics mode. Bit mapped graphics modes allow selection between displays of 2, 4,16 or 256 colours (from a 3-3-2 bit RGB palette), but horizontal resolution decreases as colour depth increases. Interlaced and non-interlaced modes are available. The maximum resolution is 640×512 pixels interlaced, or 640×256 pixels non-interlaced. These resolutions permit only a 2-colour display. A 256-colour display has a maximum resolution of 80×256. The attribute graphics mode provides a 320×256 pixel resolution with 16 colours, selectable from a palette of 256.

Multiple pages can be displayed simultaneously on the screen, even if their graphics modes are different. Each page has its own palette, which allows more colours to be displayed onscreen simultaneously. The page height can be larger than the screen or the window it is displayed on. Each page is connected to a channel of the EXOS operating system, so it is possible to write on a hidden page.

Sound 

The sound is handled by the second ASIC chip, "Dave", and has 3 sound channels plus a noise channel. Each channel's sound can be placed freely in the stereo image. Available effects include distortion, low-pass and high-pass filters, and ring modulation.

The Enterprise firmware also provides programmable envelope generators that are more flexible than synthesizers' traditional ADSR envelope, and allow up to 255 phases to be specified for each envelope. On each phase, the envelope can adjust the sound's pitch and stereo balance.

Interfaces 

The Enterprise came included an array of connectors far beyond what was common on home computers of the time. There is an RGB output, a RS-232 / RS-423 serial port, a Centronics printer port, two external joystick ports, two cassette tape interfaces, a ROM cartridge slot, and an ordinary expansion port. To save expense, many of the connectors did not use sockets, but instead had simple edge connectors that used the exposed traces at the edge of the printed circuit board.

The BASIC ROM can be replaced by a ROM that emulates a ZX Spectrum, which allows the Enterprise to run the catalogue of thousands of Spectrum BASIC games and any other titles that don't access hardware directly; a hardware peripheral was available to provide more complete emulation for other Spectrum titles — catching Spectrum hardware accesses and issuing an interrupt so that emulation software can deal with them.

An external floppy drive became available later, and allowed access to CP/M programs, while at the same time being compatible with the MS-DOS disc format and FAT12 file structure (sub-directories etc.).

Software

System ROM 

EXOS (Enterprise Expandable Operating System) is contained in the system ROM, and is based on "channels". All peripherals are accessed through channels, which allows the programs to treat all input and output devices identically. The system ROM also contains a full-screen editor, which doubles as a simple word processor. It can edit text files and BASIC programs, as well as programs written in other languages. The editor uses the joystick for cursor control.

IS-Basic 

Enterprise does not include BASIC or any other programming language in its internal ROM, unlike most other home computers of the time. Its BASIC interpreter was supplied on a 16k ROM cartridge, and the language can be changed by switching the cartridge, a system similar to that of Acorn's BBC Micro.

IS-Basic adheres to the ANSI BASIC standard. It is a fully structured language whose wide set of control structures includes multi-line IF...THEN...ELSE, SELECT...CASE, DO...LOOP with WHILE and UNTIL conditions. The WHILE condition being at the begin and the UNTIL condition being at the end of the do-loop, and the ability to escape a loop with the EXIT LOOP statement. Procedures and functions can have both reference and value parameters, and local variables. Errors and other exceptions are handled with exception handlers.

IS-Basic has the unique ability to hold multiple programs simultaneously in memory. Each program has a separate set of global variables and line numbers, but the CHAIN statement makes it possible to call one program from another and pass parameters between them. Peripherals can be controlled directly from BASIC, so there is rarely a need to use POKE and PEEK statements.
IS-Basic has the usual commands for drawing dots, lines, circles and ellipses and for filling areas, and supports Logo-style turtle graphics. Sound commands can be entered into a queue, and executed in the background while the program execution continues.

The basic was also noted as being long-winded, an example being the command to clear the screen was commonly abbreviated to CLS, on the enterprise the command was CLEAR SCREEN with no abbreviation possible.

Other software 

Several languages besides IS-BASIC, including Forth, Lisp, Pascal and assembly, were available on either ROM cartridge or tape. Basic-to-Basic converters could convert BASIC programs written for other home computers. Some 40 games, from IS and other publishers, were listed in the catalog. IS-DOS, the CP/M compatible operating system, opened access to the wide range of CP/M programs available at that time.

History

Development 

After the 1982 introduction of the ZX Spectrum, Hong Kong trading company Locumals commissioned Intelligent Software, headed by international chess player David Levy, to develop a home computer in the UK. During development the machine had the codename DPC, which stood for damp-proof course, to confuse potential competitors. The machine was also known by the names Samurai, Oscar, Elan and Flan before the Enterprise name was finally chosen.

Entersoft, modeled after Amstrad's AMSOFT, was set up to ensure a steady supply of software for the new machine. Enterprise was announced to the press in September 1983, and some 80,000 machines were pre-ordered by the time of its April 1984 sales launch. The product did not ship until 1985, by which point the UK home computer market was already dominated by the ZX Spectrum, Commodore 64, Amstrad CPC and Acorn BBC Micro. A successor machine, the PW360, was developed in 1986 to compete against the Amstrad PCW 8256, but the company was by then in severe financial difficulties, and closed down.

Commercial failure 
The market for home computers had matured during the delays to release. There had been a downturn in the market for home computers, owing to market saturation. Large retailers proved reluctant to stock the machine, and smaller retailers were wary of stocking a machine not supported through the major retail channels. The hardware was still powerful for a home computer of the era, but there was a limited software catalogue and the price was higher than the competition. For example, the Amstrad CPC 464 included a monitor and cassette recorder, was released before the Enterprise, and retailed for less. After the initial manufacturing run of 80,000 units, it is believed that no further units were made, so the Enterprise is among the rarer home computers of the 1980s. The company shipped 20,000 units to Hungary on its closure, and a strong user community formed there.

Enterprise emulators 
 Clock Signal for macOS and Linux
 EP128Emu for Windows and Linux
 EP32 for Windows
 JSep - JavaScript Enterprise-128 emulator

References

External links 

 Enterprise Forever forum
 Hungarian page about Enterprise
 Hungarian Enterprise forum
 The German version was apparently called Mephisto PHC 64
 e64 revisited - a game-oriented history of the Enterprise
 1000BiT in English and in Italian

Z80-based home computers
Home computers
Computer-related introductions in 1985
Computers designed in the United Kingdom